Idiopappus saloyensis is a species of flowering plant in the genus Idiopappus, in the family Asteraceae. It is found only in Ecuador, where its natural habitat is subtropical or tropical high-altitude grassland. It is threatened by habitat loss.

References

Idiopappus
Flora of Ecuador
Endangered plants
Plants described in 1937
Taxonomy articles created by Polbot